Fatshark is a Swedish video game development studio based in Stockholm, Sweden. The studio is located in Stockholm. Fatshark acted as a subcontractor for several AAA titles for PC and consoles, and the studio also develops its own games. In January 2021, Tencent acquired majority control of the studio.

History 
Fatshark originated from a company called Northplay, which subcontracted for various Swedish companies between 2003 and 2008. The company is best known for its involvement with the PlayStation 3 and the Xbox 360; developing for both, Bionic Commando Rearmed 2 and versions of their PC game Lead and Gold: Gangs of the Wild West.

Later, in January 2021, it was reported that Tencent had acquired a majority stake in the company valued at around 2.2 billion sek (around  million).

Released and future games 
As a recent and smaller developer, Fatshark has had some degree of success with its early releases. In 2010, Fatshark released Lead and Gold: Gangs of the Wild West for PC. Described as "Team Fortress 2 meets Wild West", the game received a 7.0 rating from GameSpot.

A subsequent 2011 release, Hamilton's Great Adventure was received as a surprising change in the developer's choice of gameplay and genre as it focused more on single-player elements with a relatively low learning curve. Several gaming news outlets covered the company's 2012 release-announcement and footage of Krater, a role-playing video game.

Fatshark later released War of the Roses in 2012, and received a 7.5 rating from GameSpot, 8.0 rating from Eurogamer, and was listed in the Guardian as one of the best games to play in the autumn of 2012. The critics promoted the game for its innovativeness and "freshness", but also noted a rather steep learning curve. War of the Vikings was later released in 2014 as the next installment in the War Franchise. The game added new features such as special attacks, a new Arena mode and the ability to throw weapons, and was set during the Viking Age rather than 15th century England. In November 2014, Fatshark released Escape Dead Island, an adventure survival horror game set in Deep Silver's Dead Island universe, and is met with mostly negative reviews from game critics. In 2015, the company released Warhammer: End Times – Vermintide, which sold more than 500,000 units. This was followed by its sequel, Warhammer: Vermintide 2, released in 2018. Warhammer 40,000: Darktide was released in November 2022.

Games

References

External links 
Official website

Companies based in Stockholm
Video game companies established in 2008
2021 mergers and acquisitions
Privately held companies of Sweden
Video game companies of Sweden
Video game development companies
Swedish companies established in 2008
Tencent divisions and subsidiaries